McNicol is a surname. Notable people with the surname include:

Archibald McNicol (1878–1933), New Zealand politician
David McNicol (diplomat) (1913–2001), Australian diplomat
David McNicol (politician) (1833–?), Scottish-born Canadian politician
Evelyn McNicol (née Camrass; born 1927), Scottish explorer
Iain McNicol (born 1969), British politician and trade unionist
Joey McNicol, Australian activist
Ross McNicol (born 1979), English photographer

See also
McNichol

Patronymic surnames